Support surface is any material, such as a mattress, that supports people who are bed-ridden through illness. Research and development of appropriate support surfaces can alleviate some of the complications of immobility, such as bedsores and respiratory problems.

The National Pressure Ulcer Advisory Panel's (NPUAP) Support Surface  
Standards Initiative (S3I) has released the first version  
of its Terms and Definitions Document. This set of definitions is  
provided in an attempt to redefine commonly used and confused terms.  
The terms describe support surface features, components,  categories,  
and performance characteristics.

The Terms and Definitions Document and an evaluation form can be found  
at NPUAP`s site

Problems of immobility
As long as people have been bed-ridden through illness, they have fallen victim to the complications of immobility. These can include, but are not limited to:
Disorders of the skin and underlying tissue.
Pneumonia and other related respiratory illnesses.
Disorders of the renal and gastrointestinal systems.
Disruption in the cognitive systems resulting in neuro-psychological disorders.

Critically ill patients, unable to move spontaneously, are nursed in the supine position for extended periods of time. This is in striking contrast to normal human beings who, even during sleep, change their position approximately every 11.6 min–a phenomenon described by Keane as "minimum physiological mobility requirement." The deleterious effects of prolonged immobilization affect the heart, vascular system, musculoskeletal system, skin, and kidneys, despite the usual nursing practice of repositioning every two hours.

Traditional methods of dealing with immobility
The traditional method of dealing with immobility is to turn the patient at least every two hours, following a side-back-side protocol. Through the years, many mechanical systems have been improvised to prevent these complications of immobility:
Sheepskin laid on top of the patient's mattress.
Foam mattresses and overlays.
Non-powered and powered air mattresses

Medical equipment